Steam Mill is an unincorporated community in Seminole County, in the U.S. state of Georgia.

History
A post office called Steam Mill was established in 1852, and remained in operation until 1910. The community was named for its steam mill which processed cotton and grain. A variant name was "Dickersons Store".

References

Unincorporated communities in Georgia (U.S. state)
Unincorporated communities in Seminole County, Georgia